Kanekal is a village in Anantapur district of the Indian state of Andhra Pradesh. It is the headquarters of Kanekal mandal in Kalyandurg revenue division.

References 

Villages in Anantapur district
Mandal headquarters in Anantapur district